Ömer Lütfi Yasan (1878; Merzifon - March 12, 1956; Istanbul) was a Turkish officer of the Ottoman Army, and a politician of the Republic of Turkey. He became the Minister of the Public Works (December 27, 1920 – November 14, 1921) in the cabinet of Mustafa Kemal Pasha (Atatürk).

Medals and decorations
Medal of Independence with Green Ribbon

Sources

1878 births
1956 deaths
People from Merzifon
Ottoman Military Academy alumni
Ottoman Military College alumni
Ottoman Army officers
Ottoman military personnel of the Italo-Turkish War
Ottoman military personnel of the Balkan Wars
Ottoman military personnel of World War I
Turkish people of the Turkish War of Independence
Deputies of Amasya
Government ministers of Turkey
Recipients of the Medal of Independence with Green Ribbon (Turkey)
Committee of Union and Progress politicians